Del Rosa (corruption of de la Rosa, Spanish for "of the Rose") is a neighborhood community in the city of San Bernardino, California.

History
Del Rosa is derived from a Spanish phrase meaning "of the rose".

Geography
Del Rosa is located 5.4 miles northeast of downtown San Bernardino in San Bernardino County, California. The coordinates are 34.853N, -117.13W, and the elevation is 1,321 feet, and it is in the Pacific Time Zone (UTC-8, UTC-7 in the summer).

Climate
Del Rosa has a hot-summer Mediterranean climate. It experiences mild winters and hot, dry summers.

References

Neighborhoods in San Bernardino, California